Kirill Ulk (1886 Pärsamaa  Parish (now Saaremaa Parish), Kreis Ösel – ?) was an Estonian politician. He was a member of II Riigikogu. He was a member of the Riigikogu since 15 January 1926, representing the Estonian Socialist Workers' Party. He replaced Mihkel Neps.

References

1886 births
Year of death missing
People from Saaremaa Parish
People from Kreis Ösel
Estonian Socialist Workers' Party politicians
Members of the Riigikogu, 1923–1926